Bromeliohyla melacaena is a frog in the family Hylidae endemic to Honduras.  Scientists have observed it in pine forests between 1370 and 1990 meters above sea level.

Appearance
The adult male frog measures 21.8 - 22.6 mm in snout-vent length and the adult female frog 24.2 - 25.9 mm.

This frog exhibits considerable sexual dimorphism: The adult male frog has spikes on its thumbs. The adult male frogs are light brown with yellow spots and some light green marks.  The bones are white and visible through the skin.  The legs are light brown.  The skin of the ventrum is white.  The adult female frog is dark brown with a light brown intraocular stripe.  The snout is yellow-green in color. The female frog has a lighter belly than the male frog. They iris is orange with black spots in both male and female frogs.

Scientists believe this frog is nocturnal, hiding in bromeliad plants during the day.  No tadpoles have been observed, but scientists infer that the young grow in water deposits in bromeliad plants and that they are ovoviviparous.

Threats
This frog is in endangered.  Causes include habitat loss, deforestation, urbanization, and loss of forest for agriculture and grasing.  The population has suffered from droughts, floods, climate change, and increased UV sensitivity.  Pesticides, fertilizers, and pollutants can all kill this frog.  This frog also suffers from such diseases as chytridiomycosis.

Etymology
The scientific name of this frog, melacaena, comes from two Greek language words meaning "black" and "thorn or spine." The scientists named it after the black spikes on the male frogs' thumbs.

Original description

References

Fauna of Central America
Amphibians described in 2006
Endemic fauna of Honduras
melacaena